Konrad Mannert (April 17, 1756 – September 27, 1834) was a Prussian historian and geographer.

Mannert was born in Altdorf bei Nürnberg, where he did his studies. In 1784 he became a teacher at the Sebaldusschule in Nuremberg, and in 1788 at the Ägidiusgymnasium there. In 1796 he became professor of history at the University of Altdorf, in 1805 at the University of Würzburg, in 1807 at the Ludwig Maximilian University of Munich (then in Landshut), and from 1826 at the same university in its new location in Munich. He died in Munich in 1834. His historical work was known in particular for its focus on studying primary sources.

Works
 Kompendium der deutschen Reichsgeschichte, Nuremberg, 1803 – Compendium of German Reich history.
 Älteste Geschichte Bojariens, Sulzbach, 1807 – Oldest Bojarian history.
 Kaiser Ludwig IV., Landshut, 1812 – Emperor Louis IV
 Geographie der Griechen und Römer, Nuremberg, 1795–1825, 10 volumes – Geography of the Greeks and Romans.
 Tabula Peutingeriana, Munich, 1824 – Tabula Peutingeriana.
 Geschichte Bayerns, Leipzig, 1826, 2 volumes – Bavarian history.
 Geschichte der alten Deutschen, besonders der Franken, Stuttgart, 1829–1832, 2 volumes – History of the ancient Germans, especially the Franks.

References
 

1756 births
1834 deaths
People from Altdorf bei Nürnberg
18th-century German historians
German geographers
Academic staff of the University of Altdorf
Academic staff of the University of Würzburg
Academic staff of the Ludwig Maximilian University of Munich
German male non-fiction writers
19th-century German historians